The 1923 Tour de France was the 17th edition of Tour de France, one of cycling's Grand Tours. The Tour began in Paris with a flat stage on 24 June, and Stage 8 occurred on 8 July with a flat stage to Toulon. The race finished in Paris on 22 July.

Stage 1
24 June 1923 — Paris to Le Havre,

Stage 2
26 June 1923 — Le Havre to Cherbourg-en-Cotentin,

Stage 3
28 June 1923 — Cherbourg-en-Cotentin to Brest,

Stage 4
30 June 1923 — Brest to Les Sables-d'Olonne,

Stage 5
2 July 1923 — Les Sables-d'Olonne to Bayonne,

Stage 6
4 July 1923 — Bayonne to Luchon,

Stage 7
6 July 1923 — Luchon to Perpignan,

Stage 8
8 July 1923 — Perpignan to Toulon,

References

1923 Tour de France
Tour de France stages